Take Care Now was an independent provider of Out-of-hours services in England. The company had contracts  in Cambridgeshire, Suffolk, Great Yarmouth and Waveney, and Worcester.

Civil action against the company
In May 2009, civil legal action was begun against Take Care Now after a locum doctor, Daniel Ubani recruited by TCN, through a locum agency, was convicted of manslaughter for giving a patient an overdose of morphine. He had flown into the UK the day before his 12-hour Cambridgeshire shift for Take Care Now and had only had a few hours' sleep. A spokeswoman for the Care Quality Commission said: ""We are aware of a number of concerns in relation to out-of-hours care provided by Take Care Now to the NHS."

Demise
Take Care Now has been taken over by Harmoni and is now trading as Suffolk Integrated Healthcare.

References

External links
Take Care Now Official website

Private providers of NHS services